Abram "Bram" Muusse (born 4 August 1946, Zaandam) is a Dutch sprint canoer who competed in the late 1960s. He was eliminated in the semifinals of the K-4 1000 m event at the 1968 Summer Olympics in Mexico City.

References
Sports-reference.com profile

1946 births
Living people
Canoeists at the 1968 Summer Olympics
Dutch male canoeists
Olympic canoeists of the Netherlands
Sportspeople from Zaanstad
20th-century Dutch people
21st-century Dutch people